Tyrihans was a Norwegian satirical magazine.

It existed between 1892 and 1904, and was published out of Kristiania. Among its staff were Axel Maurer (editor), Olaf Gulbransson, Andreas Bloch and Ragnvald Blix.

References

1892 establishments in Norway
1904 disestablishments in Norway
Defunct magazines published in Norway
Magazines established in 1892
Magazines disestablished in 1904
Magazines published in Oslo
Satirical magazines published in Norway
Norwegian-language magazines